Krannonas is a village and a former municipality in the Larissa regional unit, Thessaly, Greece. Since the 2011 local government reform it is part of the municipality Kileler, of which it is a municipal unit. It is located southwest of the regional capital Larissa.  In 2011 its population was 109 for the village, 177 for the community and 2,289 for the municipal unit. The municipal unit has an area of 205.242 km2.  The seat of the municipality was Agioi Anargyroi. It is located north of Farsala and NNE of Palamas and Karditsa.

The municipal unit boundaries extend as far south as the Fyllio Mountains where its highest point is 533 m, as far north as Koilada and Larissa and as far east as Nikaia. In the west it borders the Karditsa regional unit.

In the territory of Krannonas, at a place called Palealarissa, is the site of the ancient city of Crannon, the site of the decisive battle of the Lamian War between Macedon and Athens with its allies.

Subdivisions
The municipal unit Krannonas is subdivided into the following communities (constituent villages in brackets):
Agioi Anargyroi (Agioi Anargyroi, Mesorrachi)
Agios Georgios
Doxaras
Krannonas (Krannonas, Kampos)
Kyparissos (Kyparissos, Agia Paraskevi)
Mavrovouni (Mavrovouni, Krya Vrysi)
Mikro Vouno
Psychiko
Vounaina (Vounaina, Ano Vounaina)

References

Populated places in Larissa (regional unit)